The Niki Kallithea (the best view) is a Bulgarian autogyro designed and produced by Niki Rotor Aviation of Pravets, introduced in 2011. The aircraft is supplied complete and ready-to-fly.

Design and development
The Kallithea is a development of the 2009 Niki Lightning, differing mainly in its use of a conventional two-tube tail boom that passes under the pusher propeller instead of mounting the tail boom through the propeller hub. 

The Kallithea features a single main rotor, a two-seats-in tandem enclosed cockpit with fold-up doors, tricycle landing gear and a four-cylinder, liquid and air-cooled, four stroke  Rotax 912 or six-cylinder, liquid cooled side-valve four-stroke flat six 4-litre gasoline  D-Motor LF39 aircraft engine in pusher configuration. The doors can also be removed for flight.

The aircraft fuselage is a monocoque structure made from composites and fibreglass.

Specifications (Kallithea)

See also
List of rotorcraft

References

External links

Kal
2010s Bulgarian sport aircraft
Single-engined pusher autogyros